Morán Valverde may refer to:
Rafael Morán Valverde, an officer of the Ecuadorian Navy, commander of ship Calderón in the Ecuadorian–Peruvian War
BAE Morán Valverde, the name of several ships
Morán Valverde station on the Quito Metro